Katrīna Neiburga (born 10 February 1978 in Riga) is a Latvian contemporary artist working mainly with video and set design. She has received the prestigious Latvian visual art award, the Purvitis Prize. In 2015 she collaborated with Andris Eglitis at the 56th Venice Biennale with a multimedia art installation, "Armpit." And in 2016 participated in the Coachella Valley Music and Arts Festival. According to the Desert Sun, Neiburga is one of the most recognized video artists in Latvia.

References

External links 
 

1978 births
Living people
21st-century Latvian women artists
Multimedia artists
Women multimedia artists
Latvian video artists
People from Riga